2005 Continental Championships may refer to:

African Championships
 Basketball: FIBA Africa Championship 2005

Asian Championships
 Athletics: 2005 Asian Athletics Championships
 Baseball: 2005 Asian Baseball Championship
 Basketball: 2005 FIBA Asia Championship
 Football (soccer): 2005 AFC Champions League
 Multisport: 2005 Asian Indoor Games

European Championships
 Artistic Gymnastics: 2005 European Artistic Gymnastics Championships
 Athletics: 2005 European Athletics Indoor Championships
 Basketball: EuroBasket 2005
 Figure Skating: 2005 European Figure Skating Championships
 Football (soccer): 2004–05 UEFA Champions League
 Football (soccer): 2004–05 UEFA Cup
 Football (soccer): 2005 UEFA European Under-17 Championship
 Football (soccer): 2004–05 UEFA Women's Cup
 Shooting: 2005 European Shooting Championships, 2005 European 10 m Events Championships
 Volleyball: 2005–06 CEV Champions League
 Volleyball: 2005–06 CEV Women's Champions League

Oceanian Championships
 Basketball: 2005 FIBA Oceania Championship
 Football (soccer): 2005 OFC Club Championship

Pan American Championships / North American Championships
 Athletics: 2005 Pan American Junior Athletics Championships
 Basketball: 2005 FIBA Americas Championship
 Judo: 2005 Pan American Judo Championships
 Football (soccer): 2005 Caribbean Cup
 Football (soccer): 2005 CONCACAF Champions' Cup
 Football (soccer): 2005 CONCACAF Gold Cup
 Gymnastics (artistic and rhythmic): 2005 Pan American Gymnastics Championships

South American Championships
 Football (soccer): 2005 Copa Libertadores

See also
 2005 World Championships (disambiguation)
 2005 World Junior Championships (disambiguation)
 2005 World Cup (disambiguation)
 Continental championship (disambiguation)

Continental championships